Bettina Stark-Watzinger (Stark, born 12 May 1968) is a German economist and politician of the Free Democratic Party (FDP) who has been serving as Minister of Education and Research in Chancellor Olaf Scholz's  cabinet since 2021. She has been a member of the Bundestag from the state of Hesse since 2017. Since 2021, she has been the chairwoman of the FDP in Hesse.

Early life and career 
Stark-Watzinger graduated from high school in 1989 and subsequently studied economics at the University of Mainz and the Goethe University Frankfurt from 1989 to 1993. She graduated with a degree in economics.

From 1994 to 1996, Stark-Watzinger completed a trainee programme at BHF Bank in Frankfurt, where she worked as Regional Manager. This was followed by a six-year stay abroad in the United Kingdom from the end of 1996 to 2001, where she initially worked in the financial sector again in London, and a family break. From 2006 to 2008 she worked in the Academic Manager, Finance, Accounting, Controlling and Taxation Department at the European Business School in Oestrich-Winkel. From 2008 until her election to the Bundestag in 2017, Stark-Watzinger worked as managing director in the commercial department of an interdisciplinary research institution, the Leibniz Institute for Financial Research (SAFE) at Goethe University Frankfurt.

Political career

Early beginnings
While in secondary school, Stark-Watzinger initially joined the Young Union (JU), the joint youth organisation of the two conservative German political parties, CDU and CSU. She later became a member of the FDP in 2004.

In 2011, Stark-Watzinger was elected to the FDP leadership in Hesse, under successive chairpersons Jörg-Uwe Hahn (2011–2014) and Stefan Ruppert (2014–2021). When Ruppert became chairman, he appointed her to the position of secretary general in 2015.

Member of the German Parliament, 2017–present
Stark-Watzinger first became a member of the Bundestag in the 2017 German federal election, representing the Main-Taunus district.

From 2017 until 2020, Stark-Watzinger chaired the Finance Committee. In this capacity, she also served as her parliamentary group's rapporteur on plans for a financial transaction tax.

At the end of January 2020, Stark-Watzinger was elected parliamentary manager of the FDP parliamentary group in the Bundestag. In this capacity, she was a member of the parliament's Council of Elders, which – among other duties – determines daily legislative agenda items and assigns committee chairpersons based on party representation. She also joined the Budget Committee, where she served as her parliamentary group's rapporteur on the annual budget of the Federal Ministry of Education and Research. She was a member of the so-called Confidential Committee (Vertrauensgremium) of the Budget Committee, which provides budgetary supervision for Germany's three intelligence services, BND, BfV and MAD.

In addition to her committee assignments, Stark-Watzinger has been part of the German Parliamentary Friendship Group for Relations with the States of South Asia since 2018. Since 2019, she has been a member of the German delegation to the Franco-German Parliamentary Assembly.

In 2021, Stark-Watzinger was elected chairwoman of the FDP in Hesse, succeeding Stefan Ruppert.

In the negotiations to form a so-called traffic light coalition of the Social Democratic Party (SPD), the Green Party and the FDP following the 2021 German elections, Stark-Watzinger was part of her party's delegation in the leadership group, alongside Christian Lindner, Volker Wissing and Marco Buschmann.

Federal Education Minister, 2021–present 
Following the 2021 federal election, the FDP entered a traffic light coalition government, and Stark-Watzinger took office as Minister of Education and Research in the Scholz cabinet on 8 December 2021. In her capacity as minister, Stark-Watzinger is a member of the Joint Science Conference (GWK), a body which deals with all questions of research funding, science and research policy strategies and the science system that jointly affect Germany's federal government and its 16 federal states.

Other activities
 Deutsche Telekom Foundation, Member of the Board of Trustees
 Volkswagen Foundation, Ex-Officio Member of the Board of Trustees (since 2022)
 Leibniz Association, Ex-Officio Member of the Senate (since 2022)
 Helmholtz Association of German Research Centres, Ex-Officio Member of the Senate (since 2022)
 German Academy of Science and Engineering (acatech), Ex-Officio Member of the Senate (since 2022)
 German National Association for Student Affairs, Ex-Officio Member of the Board of Trustees (since 2022)
 Bildung & Begabung, Ex-Officio Chair of the Board of Trustees (since 2022)
 Jugend forscht, Ex-Officio Chair of the Board of Trustees (since 2022)
 Deutsches Museum, Member of the Board of Trustees (since 2022)
 Alexander von Humboldt Foundation, Ex-Officio Member of the Board of Trustees (since 2021)
 Ernst Reuter Foundation for Advanced Study, Ex-Officio Vice-Chair of the Board of Trustees (since 2021)
 German Future Prize, Ex-Officio Member of the Board of Trustees (since 2021)
 Villa Vigoni – German-Italian Centre for the European Dialogue, Ex-Officio Member of the Board of Trustees (since 2021)
 Total E-Quality initiative, Member of the Board of Trustees
 Friedrich Naumann Foundation, Member of the Board (since 2018)
 Karl-Hermann Flach Foundation, Member of the Advisory Board
 Leibniz Institute for Financial Research (SAFE), Member of the Policy Council

Personal life 
Stark-Watzinger is married to real estate investor Hermann Watzinger and has two daughters.

References

External links 

  
 Bundestag biography 
 

 

1968 births
Living people
21st-century German women politicians
Education ministers of Germany
Female members of the Bundestag
Members of the Bundestag for the Free Democratic Party (Germany)
Members of the Bundestag for Hesse
Members of the Bundestag 2017–2021
Members of the Bundestag 2021–2025
Politicians from Frankfurt
Women federal government ministers of Germany
Women government ministers of Germany